Voll (historically: Rennebu) is a village in the municipality of Rennebu in Trøndelag county, Norway. Rennebu Church is located in the village.

References

Villages in Trøndelag
Rennebu